The Kelai River is a river of Borneo, in the province of East Kalimantan, Indonesia, about  north the provincial capital Samarinda. It is a tributary of the Berau River.

Geography
The river flows in the eastern area of Kalimantan with predominantly tropical rainforest climate (designated as Af in the Köppen-Geiger climate classification). The wettest month is December, with an average of  rainfall, and the driest is August, with  rainfall.

See also
List of rivers of Indonesia
List of rivers of Kalimantan

References

Rivers of East Kalimantan
Rivers of Indonesia